Dumfriesshire (Gaelic: Siorrachd Dhùn Phris) is a constituency of the Scottish Parliament (Holyrood) covering part of the council area of Dumfries and Galloway. It elects one Member of the Scottish Parliament (MSP) by the plurality (first past the post) method of election. It is also one of nine constituencies in the South Scotland electoral region, which elects seven additional members, in addition to nine constituency MSPs, to produce a form of proportional representation for the region as a whole.

Created for the 2011 Scottish Parliament election, the constituency comprises areas that were previously part of the old Dumfries and Galloway and Upper Nithsdale constituencies, which were abolished  and replaced by Dumfriesshire and Galloway and West Dumfries.

The seat has been held by Oliver Mundell of the Scottish Conservatives since the 2016 Scottish Parliament election. Mundell is the son of former Secretary of State for Scotland, David Mundell who holds the Westminster seat of Dumfriesshire, Clydesdale and Tweeddale.

Electoral region 

The other eight constituencies of the South Scotland region are Ayr, Carrick, Cumnock and Doon Valley, Clydesdale, East Lothian, Ettrick, Roxburgh and Berwickshire, Galloway and West Dumfries, Kilmarnock and Irvine Valley and Midlothian South, Tweeddale and Lauderdale.

The region covers the Dumfries and Galloway council area, part of the East Ayrshire council area, part of the East Lothian council area, part of the Midlothian council area, the Scottish Borders council area, the South Ayrshire council area and part of the South Lanarkshire council area.

Constituency boundaries and council area 

Dumfries and Galloway is represented in the Scottish Parliament by two constituencies: Dumfriesshire and Galloway and West Dumfries. Dumfriesshire covers the eastern part of the council area. The town of Dumfries is divided between the two constituencies.

The electoral wards in the Dumfriesshire constituency are listed below. All of these wards are part of Dumfries and Galloway:

Mid and Upper Nithsdale
Lochar
Nith
Annandale South
Annandale North
Annandale East and Eskdale

Member of the Scottish Parliament

Election results

2020s

2010s

Footnotes

External links

Politics of Dumfries and Galloway
Scottish Parliament constituencies and regions from 2011
Constituencies of the Scottish Parliament
Constituencies established in 2011
2011 establishments in Scotland
Lockerbie
Moffat
Annan, Dumfries and Galloway
Gretna, Dumfries and Galloway
Dumfries
Sanquhar